Morgan James (born 27 August 1999) is an English professional footballer who plays as a defender for Hyde United.

Club career
He made his debut for Doncaster Rovers on 3 October 2017, in the Football League Trophy. He turned professional in June 2018. On 11 October 2018, Morgan was loaned out to Stafford Rangers for a month.

On 31 January 2019 he was one of five players to leave Doncaster. After leaving Doncaster, he joined Hyde United.

References

1999 births
Living people
English footballers
Doncaster Rovers F.C. players
Stafford Rangers F.C. players
Hyde United F.C. players
Association football defenders